Mario Figueredo (born 6 October 1926) was a Uruguayan cyclist. He competed in the individual and team road race events at the 1948 Summer Olympics.

References

External links
 

1926 births
Possibly living people
Uruguayan male cyclists
Olympic cyclists of Uruguay
Cyclists at the 1948 Summer Olympics